Dominici may refer to:

 Dominici (surname)
 Dominici (band), the band fronted by Charlie Dominici
 The Dominici affair, involving the 1952 murder of Jack Drummond and his family
 L'Affaire Dominici (1973 film), a film starring Jean Gabin
 L'Affaire Dominici (2003 film), a film starring Michel Serrault
 Dominici (crater), a crater on Mercury

See also
 Domenici
 De Dominicis